The 2020 Los Angeles elections were held on March 3, 2020. Voters elected candidates in a nonpartisan primary, with runoff elections scheduled for November 3, 2020. Seven of the fifteen seats in the City Council were up for election.

This was the first election held in the city that correlated with recent changes in election laws, which moved elections from being held on off-years to even-numbered years to correlate with federal and state elections.

Municipal elections in California are officially nonpartisan; candidates' party affiliations do not appear on the ballot.

City Council

District 2

Candidates
Paul Krekorian, incumbent councilmember
Ayinde Jones, attorney
Rudy Melendez, laborer and artist

Did not make ballot 
Radomir V. Luza, North Hollywood Neighborhood Council Board member
Eric Preven, writer and producer
Stacey Jane Slichta
Adam Summer, Studio City Neighborhood Council Board member

Withdrew 
Vivianna Dunnigan

Results

District 4

Candidates 
David Ryu, incumbent councilmember
Nithya Raman, urban planner and activist
Sarah Kate Levy, writer and women's advocate

Did not make ballot 
Eric Christie
Susan Collins, community activist

Withdrew 
Lisa Cahan-Davis, manager at Urban Land Institute
Richard Joseph, entertainment attorney
Sarah Sun Liew, CEO of Meridian Business Legal Investment Wish Foundation
Artin Sodaify, lawyer

Results

District 6

Candidates 
Nury Martinez, incumbent councilmember
Benito Bernal, community advocate and former leader of SEIU Local 99 labor union
Bill Haller, music studio owner

Did not make ballot 
Oscar Portillo, chairperson of the Sun Valley Area Neighborhood Council

Results

District 8

Candidates 
Marqueece Harris-Dawson, incumbent councilmember

Did not make ballot 
DaJuan W. Bell
Lee A. Brothers
Tara Perry
Ingrid Rivera-Guzman
Cliff Smith
Denise Francis Woods, businesswoman

Withdrew 
Khansa T. Jones-Muhammad Clark, budget advocate

Results

District 10 
Mark Ridley-Thomas, Los Angeles County Board of Supervisor for the 2nd district
Grace Yoo, attorney
Channing Martinez, community organizer
Melvin Snell, human rights activist
Aura Vasquez, former Board of Water and Power commissioner

Did not make ballot 
Megan Abboud
Jonothan "Jace" Dawson, store manager
Dallas Fowler
Milton Hall
Holly Hancock
G. Juan Johnson, housing advocate
Anne Kim
Lily Larsen
Althea Rae Shaw
Faalaniga Smith
Jason Underhill

Withdrew 
Andrea Michelle Wade-Catena

Results

District 12

Candidates 
John Lee, incumbent councilmember
Loraine Lundquist, educator and scientist

Did not make ballot 
Asaad Alnajjar, civil structural engineer
Jose Luis Gonzalez, recreation facility director

Withdrew 
Carlos Amador, activist
Edward Antonino, labor law attorney
Brandii Grace, game designer and educator

Results

District 14

Candidates 
Kevin de León, California state senator and President pro tempore of the California State Senate
Cyndi Otteson, advertising executive and Vice President of the Eagle Rock Neighborhood Council
Raquel Zamora, teacher, counselor, social worker and small business owner
John Jimenez, nonprofit executive
Mónica Garcia, LAUSD Board of Education member for District 2

Did not make ballot 
Monica Alcaraz, community advocate
Stanley Deacon Alexander
Hal Bastian, real estate agent and consultant
David Bloom
Barry Boen
Ian K. Chi-Young
Eric Christie
Hidemi Ena
Dentis Davis Fowlkes, Hermon Neighborhood Council Board member
Jana Grochoske, model
Freddie Huguez, former baseball coach
Maria Janossy, immigration lawyer, community leader and activist
Marcus Lovingood, new media producer, political activist, and internet entrepreneur
William "Rodriguez" Morrison, community organizer and perennial candidate
Kendrick Rustad, creative director of KR Interior Design Group
Jamie Tijerina, researcher at California Institute of Technology

Withdrew 
Richelle Huizar, wife of vacated councilmember José Huizar
Brian Andres Mico-Quinn

Results

LAUSD Board of Education

District 1

Candidates 
George J. McKenna III, incumbent board member

Did not make ballot 
Michael Batie, author and professor
John Brasfield, educator, boxer, and coach
Toni Henderson
Tunette Powell, educator and activist

Results

District 3

Candidates 
Scott Schmerelson, incumbent board member
Marilyn Koziatek, member of parent-teacher association
Elizabeth Badger, small businessowner and CEO of Minority Outreach Committee

Did not make ballot 
John Sandy Campbell, teacher
Annette McClain, pharmacy tech
Christopher Meredith, substitute teacher
Kenneth "Kenchy" Ragsdale III, founder of Kids Not Politics

Results

District 5 
Jackie Goldberg, incumbent board member
Christina Martinez Duran, teacher, adviser, and educational consultant

Did not make ballot 
Maria del Pilar Avalos, member of the Community Advisory Committee

Results

District 7

Candiatees 
Tanya Ortiz Franklin, lawyer and former teacher
Patricia Castellanos, deputy director of L.A. Alliance for a New Economy
Silke Bradford, teacher and school administrator
Mike Lansing, former LAUSD board member from 1999 to 2007

Did not make ballot 
Estuardo Ruano, homeless activist

Withdrew 
Nichelle Henderson, member of the Los Angeles Community College Board of Trustees
Lydia Gutierrez, math teacher
Edgar Campos

Results

References

External links
 Office of the City Clerk, City of Los Angeles

Los Angeles
2020
Los Angeles